.cl is the Internet country code top-level domain (ccTLD) for Chile. It was created in 1987 and is administered by the University of Chile.  Registration of second-level domains under this TLD is open to anyone, as established by the current regulation for the operation of the Domain Name Registration .CL since December 2013,
which eliminated the requirement for foreign registrants to have a local contact  with a RUN, the Chilean national identification number.

Registration of names including accented letters (á, é, í, ó, ú), ñ and ü was opened up in 2005.

Since April 2011, it supports DNSSEC.

Microsoft used it in a domain hack for its social networking service so.cl.  Oracle Corporation uses the domain hack ora.cl as a URL shortening service.

IPv6 support
In the Hurricane Electric report from May 2012, it appears as IPv6 enabled domain and with nameservers in IPv6.

See also 
 Internationalized domain name
 Internet in Chile

References

External links
 NIC Chile is currently the domain registrar for the .cl ccTLD
 IANA .cl whois information
 Syntax rules for domain names under .CL in NIC Chile site

Country code top-level domains
Internet in Chile
University of Chile

sv:Toppdomän#C